5α-Dihydrolevonorgestrel (5α-DHLNG) is an active metabolite of the progestin levonorgestrel which is formed by 5α-reductase. It has about one-third of the affinity of levonorgestrel for the progesterone receptor. In contrast to levonorgestrel, the compound has both progestogenic and antiprogestogenic activity, and hence has a selective progesterone receptor modulator-like profile of activity. This is analogous to the case of norethisterone and 5α-dihydronorethisterone. In addition to the progesterone receptor, 5α-DHLNG interacts with the androgen receptor. These metabolites are considered to be responsible for the weak estrogenic activity of high doses of levonorgestrel.

See also
 5α-Dihydronorethisterone
 5α-Dihydroethisterone
 5α-Dihydronandrolone
 5α-Dihydronormethandrone

References

5α-Reduced steroid metabolites
Ethynyl compounds
Androgens and anabolic steroids
Enantiopure drugs
Estranes
Human drug metabolites
Ketones
Selective progesterone receptor modulators
Synthetic estrogens